Virve Hannele "Vicky" Rosti (born 10 November 1958, Helsinki, Finland) is a Finnish singer of popular music. Her most famous songs include "Kun Chicago kuoli" (the debut single from 1975, a Finnish language cover version of "The Night Chicago Died" by Paper Lace), "Tuolta saapuu Charlie Brown" ("Charlie Brown" by Benito di Paula), "Menolippu" ("One Way Ticket"), "Oon voimissain" ("I Will Survive"), "Tunnen sen täysillä taas" ("Total Eclipse of the Heart"), "Sata salamaa" (One hundred lightnings) and "Jolene". During her career, Rosti has sold over 75,000 certified records, which places her among the top 50 best-selling female soloists in Finland.

Rosti represented her home country in the Eurovision Song Contest 1987 in Belgium. She sang "Sata salamaa", composed by Petri Laaksonen. The song finished 15th out of 22, scoring 28 points.

Rosti currently sings in the band Menneisyyden Vangit together with Freeman.

In 2015, she features on the fourth season of the Nelonen series Vain elämää.

Discography

Studio albums 
 Vicky (1975)
 1-2-3-4-tulta! (1976) (Gold 1976, Platinum 1977)
 Vickyshow (1977)
 Tee mulle niin (1978)
 Oon voimissain (1979)
 Sata salamaa (1987)
 Tunnen sen täysillä taas (1992)
 Sydämeen kirjoitettu (2000)
 Vicky Rock Vol. 1 (2007)
 Pitkästä aikaa (2014)

Collections 
 Parhaat (1989)
 20 suosikkia – Kun Chicago kuoli (1995)
 20 suosikkia – 1-2-3-4-tulta! (2000)
 Parhaat (2004) (Gold 2004)

References

External links

 Official website VirveRosti.fi
 Menneisyyden Vangit Official band website
 Virve "Vicky" Rosti biography, discography and album reviews, credits & releases at AllMusic
 Virve "Vicky" Rosti discography, album releases & credits at Discogs
 Virve "Vicky" Rosti albums to be listened as stream on Spotify

1958 births
Living people
Eurovision Song Contest entrants of 1987
Eurovision Song Contest entrants for Finland
20th-century Finnish women singers
21st-century Finnish women singers